The International Stuttering Association (ISA), founded in Linköping, Sweden, in July 1995, is a nonprofit international support group organization for people who stutter. The current chair (since 2019) is Anja Herde.

Membership
Membership of ISA is open to national or international self-help organizations of people who stutter. Individuals can become non-voting special friends or honorary members.

The first honorary lifetime members of ISA are Jane Fraser of the Stuttering Foundation of America, and Judith Kuster.

Publications
The Association's newsletter, One Voice,  is published once a year and is a joint project with the European League of Stuttering Associations.

International Stuttering Awareness Day (ISAD)
Together with the International Fluency Association and the European League of Stuttering Associations, the International Stuttering Association celebrates International Stuttering Awareness Day, which includes an online conference on stuttering and a media campaign, every 22 October.

References

External links
 Belgium Stammering Association

1995 establishments in Sweden
International medical and health organizations
International organizations based in the United States
Organizations established in 1995
Stuttering associations